The Waiting Land is a book by Irish author Dervla Murphy. It was first published by John Murray in 1967 and has been described as one of the top ten books about the Himalayas.

Summary
The Waiting Land is the third in a trilogy of books, following on from Full Tilt and Tibetan Foothold, describing Murphy's involvement with the self-sufficient mountain cultures of the Himalayas. Lured by the chance to work again with Tibetan refugees in the Pokhara Valley, Murphy moves into a tiny room above a stall in a bazaar. There she falls under the spell of Nepal and its ancient roots. The book culminates with a trek to the remote Langtang region on the border with Tibet.

Publication history
 1967: John Murray, 216pp
 1986: ISIS Large Print, 312pp, 
 1987: Century, 216pp, 
 1990: Arrow, 216pp, 
 1998: Flamingo, 216pp, 
 2011: Eland Books, 216pp,

References

External links
 

1967 non-fiction books
Eland Books books
John Murray (publishing house) books
Books by Dervla Murphy